Eyo or EYO may refer to:

People 
 Alicya Eyo (born 1975), British actress
 Effiong Okon Eyo (1918–1983), Nigerian politician
 Eyo Esua (1901–1973), Nigerian teacher and trade unionist 
 Eyo Ita (1903–1972), Nigerian politician

Other uses 
 Eyo (novel), by Abidemi Sanusi
 Eyo!, an album by the Belgian band K3
 Keiyo language, spoken in Kenya
 Eyo festival, in Lagos, Nigeria